Forbidden Ground is a Hungarian film directed by Pál Gábor. It was released in 1968.

Cast
 György Bánffy - Benedek Kiss
 Zoltán Vadász - Ádám Hoffer
 István Avar - Attorney
 Ferenc Némethy
 Margit Dajka - Mrs. Széki
 Gyöngyi Bürös
 Mária Mezei
 István Novák
 Erzsi Orsolya
 Rita Békés
 Eta Máthé
 Erzsébet Kopácsi
 Gábor Harsányi - István Bodor
 János Kovács
 Imre Garlai
 Miklós Zoltai
 János Pásztor

External links
 

1968 films
1968 drama films
1960s Hungarian-language films
Films directed by Pál Gábor
Hungarian black-and-white films
Hungarian drama films